Reller is a surname. Notable people with the surname include:

Elizabeth Reller (1913–1974), American actress
Paul Reller, American composer
Tami Reller (born 1963/64), American businesswoman

See also
Keller (surname)
Teller (surname)